Lodewijk Johannis (Lo) de Ruiter (12 June 1919 in Zwolle – 18 May 2008 in Bergen, North Holland) was a Dutch politician.

1919 births
2008 deaths
Mayors in Overijssel
People from Zwolle
Mayors in North Holland